Tom Sandberg (born 6 August 1955) is a former nordic combined skier from Mo i Rana, Norway who competed from the mid-1970s to the mid-1980s.

During the 1982 FIS Nordic World Ski Championships, he won the 15 km individual event by 0.2 seconds over Konrad Winkler of East Germany. Sandberg also earned two medals in the team event at the world championships as well (gold: 1984, silver: 1982 – tied with Finland). His greatest year was 1984, when he became Olympic champion and won the World Cup. Sandberg also won nine national championships during his career.

Sandberg also won the Nordic combined event the Holmenkollen ski festival in 1974. Nine years later, he earned the Holmenkollen medal (Shared with Berit Aunli.).

He has his education from the Norwegian School of Sport Sciences.

References

 
 Holmenkollen medalists – click Holmenkollmedaljen for downloadable pdf file 
 Holmenkollen winners since 1892 – click Vinnere for downloadable pdf file 

1955 births
People from Rana, Norway
Living people
Nordic combined skiers at the 1976 Winter Olympics
Nordic combined skiers at the 1980 Winter Olympics
Nordic combined skiers at the 1984 Winter Olympics
Holmenkollen medalists
Holmenkollen Ski Festival winners
Norwegian male Nordic combined skiers
Olympic Nordic combined skiers of Norway
Olympic gold medalists for Norway
FIS Nordic Combined World Cup winners
Norwegian School of Sport Sciences alumni
Olympic medalists in Nordic combined
FIS Nordic World Ski Championships medalists in Nordic combined
Medalists at the 1984 Winter Olympics
Sportspeople from Nordland